Sultan Bilimkhanov Stadium is a stadium in Grozny, Chechnya, Russia.  It is currently used for football matches and is the home ground of FC Terek-2 Grozny. The stadium holds 10,200 seats. Before the start of the 2008 Premier League season, the Russian Football Union granted Terek the right to host Premier League matches in Grozny on this stadium. Before that from the 1990s to 2007 the club played its home games in the neighboring resort city of Pyatigorsk, Stavropol Krai.

FC Akhmat Grozny
Football venues in Russia
Buildings and structures in Grozny
Sport in Grozny